Margaret Shirley Mutu is a Ngāti Kahu leader, author and academic from Karikari, New Zealand and works at the University of Auckland, New Zealand. She is Māori and her iwi (tribes) are Ngāti Kahu, Te Rarawa and Ngāti Whātua.

Biography and education 
Mutu was born in Auckland. Her mother Penelope Brough-Robertson was Pākehā of Scottish descent and was a nurse at National Women's Hospital. Her father Tame / Tom Mutu was brought up in the Northern Wairoa outside of Dargaville and was Māori affiliating with Ngāti Kahu, Te Rarawa and Ngāti Whātua, all iwi from the Northland Region of New Zealand. The schools she attended whilst growing up in Mount Roskill, Auckland were Waikowhai Primary School and Mt Roskill Intermediate. After her father died Mutu went to schooling in New Plymouth, at New Plymouth Girls’ High boarding at the Rangiātea Methodist Māori Girls hostel.  

Mutu obtained a BSc in Mathematics, a MPhil in Māori Studies, a PhD in Māori Studies from the University of Auckland specialising in linguistics. Her doctoral thesis was titled Aspects of the structure of the Ùa Pou dialect of the Marquesan language.

Career 
Mutu is Professor of Māori Studies at the University of Auckland. She has taught Māori language and Treaty of Waitangi courses since 1986. Mutu is a Fellow of the Royal Society of New Zealand elected in 2017. 

Mutu holds a number of chairperson roles including of the Te Rūnanga-ā-Iwi o Ngāti Kahu (the council of representatives, or parliament, of the Ngāti Kahu iwi or nation), Ngāti Kahu's head claimant and chief negotiator for treaty claims settlements, and spokesperson to the media, a member of National Iwi Chairs' Forum (representing Ngāti Kahu). She is chairperson of Matike Mai Aotearoa: The Independent Working Group on Constitutional Transformation, convened by Moana Jackson, and chairperson of the Aotearoa Independent Monitoring Mechanism which monitors New Zealand's compliance with the United Nations Declaration on the Rights of Indigenous Peoples. She has been the chairperson of Karikari marae and Kapehu marae (in the Northern Wairoa). 

Memberships of committees and boards include the New Zealand Conservation Authority, the board of the National Institute of Water and Atmospheric Research (NIWA), the Board of Enquiry into the New Zealand Coastal Policy Statement and a technical committee of the United Nations Convention on Biodiversity. From 2009 to 2015 Mutu was a member the editorial board of AlterNative - A Journal of Indigenous Scholarship.

Honours and awards 
In 2015, the Royal Society of New Zealand awarded Mutu the Pou Aronui Award "for her sustained contributions to indigenous rights and scholarship".

In 2017, Mutu was selected as one of the Royal Society Te Apārangi's "150 women in 150 words", celebrating the contributions of women to knowledge in New Zealand.

Bibliography

Books
 Mutu, Margaret, Lloyd Pōpata, Te Kani Williams, Ānahera Herbert-Graves, Reremoana Rēnata, JudyAnn Cooze, Zarah Pineaha, Tania Thomas, Te Ikanui Kingi-Waiaua, Te Rūnanga-ā-Iwi o Ngāti Kahu and Wackrow, Williams and Davies Ltd. 2017. Ngāti Kahu: Portrait of a Sovereign Nation. Wellington, Huia Publishers. 
 Mutu, Margaret, 2011. The State of Māori Rights. Wellington, Huia Publishers. 
 Mutu, Margaret and McCully Matiu. 2003. Te Whānau Moana – Ngā kaupapa me ngā tikanga – Customs and protocols. Auckland, Reed Publishing. 
 Mutu, Margaret. 2002. Ūa Pou: Aspects of a Marquesan dialect. Canberra: Pacific Linguistics.

Journal articles
 Mutu, Margaret, 2018. "Behind the Smoke and Mirrors of the Treaty of Waitangi Claims Settlement Process in New Zealand: No Prospect for Justice and Reconciliation for Māori without Constitutional Transformation” in Journal of Global Ethics Vol.14:2. 
 Mutu, Margaret, 2014. "Indigenizing the University of Auckland" in Canadian Journal of Native Education: Indigenizing the International Academy. Vol. 37, No. 1, pp. 63–85, Vancouver, University of British Columbia. 
 Abel, Sue and Margaret Mutu, 2011. "There's Racism and then There's Racism – Margaret Mutu and the Racism Debate", in The New Zealand Journal of Media Studies, Vol. 12, No. 2, pp.1–19. 
 Mutu, Margaret. 2009. "The Role of History and Oral Traditions in the Recovery of Fagin’s Ill-gotten Gains: Settling Ngāti Kahu’s Claims against the Crown" in Te Pouhere Kōrero Journal: Māori History, Māori People, pp. 23–44.
 Mutu, Margaret. 2005. “In Search of the Missing Māori Links – Maintaining both ethnic identity and linguistic integrity in the revitalization of the Māori language” in the International Journal of the Sociology of Language. Vol. 172, pp. 117–132. New York, Mouton.

Book chapters
 Mutu, Margaret. 2017. "Māori of New Zealand" in Sharlotte Neely (ed), Native Nations: The Survival of Fourth World Peoples (2nd edn), Vernon, British Columbia, Canada, JCharlton Publishing. pp 87–113. 
 Mutu, Margaret. 2015. "Unravelling Colonial Weaving", in Paul Little and Wendyl Nissen (eds), Stroppy Old Women. Auckland, Paul Little Books. pp. 165–178. 
 Mutu, Margaret. 2012. "Custom Law and the Advent of New Pākehā Settlers: Tuku Whenua Allocation of Resource Use Rights" in Danny Keenan (ed.) Huia Histories of Māori: Ngā Tāhuhu Kōrero. Wellington, Huia. pp. 93-108. 
 Mutu, Margaret. 2012. "Fisheries Settlement: The Sea I Never Gave", in Janine Hayward and Nicola Wheen (eds), Treaty of Waitangi Settlements. Wellington, Bridget Williams Books, pp. 114–123. 
 Mutu, Margaret. 2010. "Constitutional Intentions: The Treaty Text" in Mulholland, Malcolm and Veronica Tāwahi (eds). Weeping Waters. Wellington, Huia. pp 13–40. 
 Mutu, Margaret. 2010. "Ngāti Kahu Kaitiakitanga" in Malcolm Mulholland, Rachel Selby, Pataka Moore (eds). Māori and the Environment. Wellington, Huia. pp 13–36. 
 Mutu, Margaret. 2009. "Māori Media Depiction of Chinese: From Despised and Feared to Cultural and Political Allies" in Manying Ip (ed), The Dragon and the Taniwha. Auckland, Auckland University Press.  
 Mutu, Margaret. 2006. "Recovering and Developing Ngāti Kahu's Prosperity" in Malcolm Mulholland (ed), State of the Māori Nation. Auckland, Reed Publishing. 
 Mutu, Margaret. 2004. "The Humpty Dumpty principle at work: The role of mistranslation in the British settlement of Aotearoa: The Declaration of Independence and He wakaputanga o te Rangatiratanga o nga hapu o Nu Tireni" in Sabine Fenton (ed), For better or for worse: Translation as a tool for change in the South Pacific. Manchester, England, St Jerome Publishing. 
 Mutu, Margaret. 2004. "Recovering Fagin's Ill-gotten Gains: Settling Ngāti Kahu's Treaty of Waitangi Claims against the Crown" in Michael Belgrave, David Williams and Merata Kāwharu (eds), Waitangi Revisited: Perspectives on the Treaty of Waitangi. Melbourne, Australia, Oxford University Press. 
 Mutu, Margaret. 2004. "Researching the Pacific" in Tupeni Baba, 'Okusitino Mahina, Nuhisifa Williams and Unaisi Nabobo-Baba (eds). Researching the Pacific and Indigenous Peoples. Auckland, Centre for Pacific Studies, The University of Auckland. 
 Mutu, Margaret. 2002. "Barriers to tangata whenua participation in resource management" in Merata Kāwharu (ed), Whenua: Managing our resources. Auckland, Reed Publishing.

Report
 Jackson, Moana, 2016. And Margaret Mutu, He Whakaaro Here Whakaumu Mō Aotearoa: The Report of Matike Mai Aotearoa – The Independent Working Group on Constitutional Transformation. Auckland, University of Auckland and National Iwi Chairs Forum. 125 pages.

References

Living people
Year of birth missing (living people)
Māori language revivalists
New Zealand Māori academics
New Zealand women academics
People from Auckland
Academic staff of the University of Auckland
Te Rarawa people
21st-century New Zealand women writers
21st-century New Zealand writers
New Zealand Māori women academics
Fellows of the Royal Society of New Zealand
Ngāti Kahu people
Ngāti Whātua people